Bjørn Kristvik (born 19 March 1928) is a Norwegian diplomat.

He was born in Nesset, and was a mag.art. by education. He started working for the Norwegian Ministry of Foreign Affairs in 1955. He served as the secretary for the parliamentary Standing Committee on Foreign and Constitutional Affairs from 1966 to 1970, and was afterwards posted as a counsellor at the Norwegian delegation to NATO in Brussels. He served as the Norwegian ambassador to Indonesia from 1974 to 1979, to Egypt from 1979 to 1984, to NATO from 1989 to 1992 and to Canada from 1992 to 1996.

References

1928 births
Living people
People from Nesset
Norwegian civil servants
Ambassadors of Norway to Indonesia
Ambassadors of Norway to Egypt
Permanent Representatives of Norway to NATO
Ambassadors of Norway to Canada
Norwegian expatriates in Belgium